The 2016 Tennessee Volunteers baseball team represent the University of Tennessee in the 2016 NCAA Division I baseball season.  The Volunteers play their home games in Lindsey Nelson Stadium. The team is coached by Dave Serrano in his fifth season as head coach at Tennessee.

Roster

Schedule and results

Record vs. conference opponents

References

Tennessee Volunteers
Tennessee Volunteers baseball seasons
Volunteers baseball